Tween Fest is an American comedy series produced by Funny or Die for the streaming service go90. The series, created by Nick Ciarelli and Brad Evans and directed by Scott Gairdner, follows a two-weekend outdoor festival for internet stars that descends into chaos. It stars John Michael Higgins, Joey King, Drew Tarver, Arden Cho, and Lou Wilson, with guest stars including Jane Lynch, Tim Meadows, Chris Parnell, David Koechner, and more. Tween Fest officially premiered on August 3, 2016.

Cast

Main
 John Michael Higgins as Todd Crawford
 Joey King as Maddisyn Crawford
 Drew Tarver as Zayden Ostin Storm
 Arden Cho as Lexii C.
 Lou Wilson as Dusty DelGrosso

Recurring
Jane Lynch as Sophia Sharp
Dave (Gruber) Allen as Twonkmaster Chris
Josie Totah  as Stop the Preston
Mike Mitchell as Rocco
Nick Mundy as Donny
Michael Blaiklock as Riley
Natalie Palamides as Juicetine

Guest stars
Tim Meadows
Chris Parnell
David Koechner
Josh Fadem
George Basil

Episodes

Awards and nominations

Notes

References

External links
 
Tween Fest on go90

2010s American comedy television series
2016 American television series debuts
English-language television shows
Television series by Funny or Die